Nikša Kaleb (born 9 March 1973) is a retired Croatian handball player. He is World champion from 2003 with the Croatian national team, and Olympic champion from 2004. He received a silver medal at the 2005 World Championship, and a silver medal at the 2008 European Championship.

Career
Kaleb spent most of his career playing for his hometown club RK Metković. He retired from handball in 2008.

Honours
Metković
Croatian First A League
Winner (0): 1999-00 (Revoked)
Runner-up (6): 1998-99, 1999-00, 2000–01, 2001–02, 2002–03, 2003–04
Croatian First B League
Winner (1): 1993-94
Croatian Handball Cup 
Winner (2): 2001, 2002
Runner-up (1): 2004
EHF Cup
Winner (1): 2000
Runner-up (1): 2001

Zagreb
Croatian First League
Winner (4): 2004-05, 2005–06, 2006–07, 2007-08
Croatian Handball Cup 
Winner (4): 2005, 2006, 2007, 2008
EHF Cup
Runner-up (1): 2005

Individual
Franjo Bučar State Award for Sport - 2004

Orders
 Order of Danica Hrvatska with face of Franjo Bučar - 2004

References

1973 births
Living people
Croatian male handball players
Olympic handball players of Croatia
Handball players at the 2004 Summer Olympics
Olympic gold medalists for Croatia
Sportspeople from Metković
RK Zagreb players
Olympic medalists in handball
Medalists at the 2004 Summer Olympics
20th-century Croatian people